Pancreatic polypeptide (PP) is a polypeptide secreted by PP cells in the endocrine pancreas. It regulates pancreatic secretion activities, and also impacts liver glycogen storage and gastrointestinal secretion. Its secretion may be impacted by certain endocrine tumours.

Gene 
The PPY gene encodes an unusually short protein precursor. This precursor is cleaved to produce pancreatic polypeptide, pancreatic icosapeptide, and a 5- to 7- amino-acid oligopeptide.

Structure 
Pancreatic polypeptide consists of 36 amino acids. It has a molecular weight about 4200 Da. It has a similar structure to neuropeptide Y.

Synthesis 
Pancreatic polypeptide is synthesised and secreted by PP cells (also known as gamma cells or F cells) of the pancreatic islets of the pancreas. These are found predominantly in the head of the pancreas.

Function 
Pancreatic polypeptide regulates pancreatic secretion activities by both endocrine and exocrine tissues. It also affects hepatic glycogen levels and gastrointestinal secretions.

Its secretion in humans is increased after a protein meal, fasting, exercise, and acute hypoglycaemia, and is decreased by somatostatin and intravenous glucose.

Plasma pancreatic polypeptide has been shown to be reduced in conditions associated with increased food intake and elevated in anorexia nervosa. In addition, peripheral administration of polypeptide has been shown to decrease food intake in rodents. Pancreatic polypeptide inhibits pancreatic secretion of fluid, bicarbonate, and digestive enzymes. It also stimulates gastric acid secretion. It is the antagonist of cholecystokinin and opposes pancreatic secretion stimulated by cholecystokinin. It may stimulate the migrating motor complex, synergistic with motilin.

On fasting, pancreatic polypeptide concentration is 80 pg/ml; after the meal, it rises up from 8 to 10 times more; glucose and fats also induce PP's level increase, but on parenteral introduction of those substances, the level of hormones doesn't change. The administration of atropine, the vagotomy, blocks pancreatic polypeptide secretion after meals. The excitation of the vagus nerve, the administration of gastrin, secretin or cholecystokinin induce PP secretion.

Clinical significance 
The secretion of pancreatic polypeptide may be increased by pancreatic tumours (insulin, glucagon), by Verner-Morrison syndrome, and by gastrinomas.

See also 

 Polypeptide-p
 Pancreas
List of human cell types derived from the germ layers

References

Further reading

External links 
 

Pancreatic hormones